I Declare War on You is a 1990 Soviet drama film directed by Yaropolk Lapshin.

Plot 
The film tells about a man who, after long and grueling battles in Cuba and Afghanistan, returns to his hometown to do quiet work. But circumstances force him to return to his military experience.

Cast 
 Nikolai Badyev
 Igor Bityutskiy
 Nikolai Yeremenko Jr. as Erokhin
 Oleg Korchikov as Vorotnikov
 Dmitri Nalivaichuk
 Anzhelika Nevolina as Anya
 Natalya Potapova as Hotel manager
 Gennady Sayfulin as Foma
 Nikolai Sektimenko as Erokhin's friend
 Aleksey Shemes

References

External links 
 

1990 films
1990s Russian-language films
Soviet drama films
1990 drama films